Wildcat Jordan is a 1922 American silent comedy action film directed by Alfred Santell and starring Richard Talmadge, Eugenia Gilbert and Harry von Meter.

Plot

Cast
 Richard Talmadge as 	Dick Jordan
 Eugenia Gilbert as Sylvia Grant
 Harry von Meter as Roger Gale
 Jack Waltemeyer as Billy Talbot

References

Bibliography
 Rainey, Buck. Those Fabulous Serial Heroines: Their Lives and Films. Scarecrow Press, 1990.

External links

1922 films
1922 comedy films
American black-and-white films
American silent feature films
1920s English-language films
Films directed by Alfred Santell
1920s American films
Silent American comedy films